The EMD GP39-2 is a 4-axle diesel locomotive built by General Motors Electro-Motive Division between 1974 and 1984. 239 examples of this locomotive were built for American railroads. Part of the EMD Dash 2 line, the GP39-2 was an upgraded GP39. The power for this locomotive was provided by a turbocharged 12-cylinder EMD 645E3 diesel engine, which could produce . 

Unlike the original GP39, which sold only 23 examples as railroads preferred the reliable un-turbocharged GP38, the GP39-2 was reasonably successful, ascribed to its better fuel economy relative to the GP38-2 which became of more interest in the 1970s energy crisis, and to its better performance at altitude.

Original Owners

The GP39-2 sold to five railroads and two industrial operators:

Rebuilds

Several GP40-2 locomotives were rebuilt by Morrison–Knudsen with head-end power generators, which meant that 1,000 horsepower of the locomotive would go to the generator instead of being used for tractive effort. Because of this, they were renamed the GP38H-2 class of locomotives.

Preservation
Only one GP39-2 is preserved as of 2019:

CSX 4317, former Reading Company 3412, is preserved at the Reading Company Technical and Historical Society in Hamburg Pennsylvania. 4317 is the first GP39-2 in preservation.

References

External links

 Sarberenyi, Robert. EMD GP39-2 Original Owners

GP39-2
B-B locomotives
Diesel-electric locomotives of the United States
Railway locomotives introduced in 1974
Standard gauge locomotives of the United States